John Brian Sedgley (17 February 1939 – 29 November 2020) was an English cricketer who played first-class cricket for Worcestershire between 1959 and 1961.

Sedgley's first two first-class games, in 1959, were against Cambridge and Oxford Universities respectively. In 1960 he appeared on 11 occasions, and made his highest score in June when he scored 95 against Derbyshire before being run out. His first-class career was completed in 1961 with two matches in June, in neither of which was he successful.

Notes

References

English cricketers
Worcestershire cricketers
1939 births
2020 deaths
Sportspeople from West Bromwich